The United States Senate elections of 1923 were special elections that occurred in the near the end of Republican President Warren G. Harding's term.  The Farmer-Labor party gained one seat from Republicans who kept the other seat and their majority.

Change in Senate composition

Before the elections 
At the beginning of the 68th Congress in March 1923.

After the special elections

Elections during the 68th Congress 
In these special elections, the winners were seated after March 4, 1923.

Minnesota (special)

Vermont (special)

See also
 1922 United States elections
 1922 United States Senate elections
 1922 United States House of Representatives elections
 67th United States Congress
 68th United States Congress

References

 
1923